Eileen A. Kato (born September 5, 1950) is an American lawyer, retired judge, and  member of the American Bar Association's Justice Kennedy Commission on Sentencing, and past chair of the American Bar Association's Conference on Specialized Court Judges.

Education
She graduated from San Jose State University in 1976 with a Bachelor of Science and in 1977 with a Master of Business Administration. She graduated in 1980 with a Juris Doctor from Santa Clara University School of Law.

Legal career
She has worked as a special assistant to the U.S. Attorney for the Western Washington District, and as a senior trial attorney with the Department of the Treasury. She practiced as an attorney in two private firms before joining the bench in King County, Washington, in 1994.

Judicial career
From 1994 to 2016, she served as a Judge for the King County District Court of Washington. She retired in 2016.

Post retirement
Since 2017, she has served as a member of the American Bar Association's Justice Kennedy Commission on Sentencing.

References

External links
 http://www.truth-or-consequences.com/apartment_living/parking.shtml

1950 births
People from Ogden, Utah
Living people
Santa Clara University School of Law alumni
Santa Clara University alumni